Aijuswanaseing (pronounced as "I Just Wanna Sing") is the debut studio album by American singer Musiq Soulchild. It was released on November 14, 2000 through Def Soul Recordings and Island Def Jam Music Group. The album debuted at number 32 on the US Billboard 200 chart on December 2, 2000. On the Billboard 200, it peaked at #24 on April 7, 2001, and after spending 41 weeks on the chart, exited on September 8, 2001; on the Top R&B/Hip-Hop albums chart, it spent 67 weeks, falling off on June 1, 2002.

Track listing 

• other versions replace the track "The Ingredients of Love" duet with Angie Stone with "North Star".

Personnel

AAries - Primary Artist
Louis Alfred III - Engineer
Kwaku Alston - Photography
Ayana - Primary Artist, Vocals, Vocals (Background)
Ayinke - Vocals, Vocals (Background)
Ivan "Orthodox" Barias - Composer, Producer
Junius Bervine - Keyboards, Producer
S. Brown - Composer
Rob Chiarelli - Mixing
Commissioner Gordon - Mixing
V. Davis - Composer
Vidal Davis - Drums, Keyboards
Vikter Duplaix - Drum Programming, Mixing, Producer
Russell Elevado - Mixing
Şerban Ghenea - Engineer, Mixing
Larry Gold - String Arrangements, String Conductor
Akisia Grigsby - Art Direction, Design
Carvin "Ransum" Haggins - Composer
A. Harris - Composer
Andre Harris - Keyboards, Producer, Strings
Bobby Hebb - Composer
Jerome Hipps - Executive Producer
Leonard Hubbard - Bass

T. Johnson - Composer
K. Jones - Composer
Ben Kenney - Bass (Electric)
Ed King - Drum Programming, Engineer, Producer
Pete Kuzma - Keyboards, Piano
Steve Manning - Mixing
Magdaleno Martinez - Composer
Michael McArthur - Executive Producer
T. Moore - Composer
Musiq Soulchild - Executive Producer, Keyboards, Primary Artist, Vocal Arrangement, Vocals, Vocals (Background)
Osunlade - Bass, Composer, Drums, Fender Rhodes, Producer
Pino Palladino - Bass
Keith Pelzer - Engineer, Vocal Arrangement
Isaac Phillips - Guitar
James Poyser - Keyboards, Organ, Producer, Wurlitzer
Tony Prendatt - Mixing
Eric Roberson - Vocal Arrangement, Vocals (Background)
Francesco Romano - Guitar
Jill Scott - Vocal Arrangement
Jon Smeltz - Engineer
Storm - Engineer
Frank Sutton - Engineer
Eric Tribbett - Drums

Charts

Weekly charts

Year-end charts

Certifications

References

Musiq Soulchild albums
2000 debut albums
Def Jam Recordings albums
Albums produced by Dre & Vidal
Albums produced by James Poyser